Babella crassicostata is a species of sea snail, a marine gastropod mollusk in the family Pyramidellidae, the pyrams and their allies. The species is one of twelve known species within the Babella genus of gastropods.

Distribution
This marine species occurs in the Pacific Ocean off the coast of Vietnam.

References

External links
 To World Register of Marine Species

Pyramidellidae
Gastropods described in 1958